The 1975 All-Ireland Under-21 Football Championship was the 12th staging of the All-Ireland Under-21 Football Championship since its establishment by the Gaelic Athletic Association in 1964.

Mayo entered the championship as defending champions, however, they were defeated by Dublin in the All-Ireland semi-final.

On 12 October 1975, Kerry won the championship following a 1-15 to 0-10 defeat of Dublin in the All-Ireland final. This was their third All-Ireland title overall and their first in two championship seasons.

Results

All-Ireland Under-21 Football Championship

Semi-finals

Final

Statistics

Miscellaneous

 Kerry become the first team to win senior, minor and under-21 All-Ireland titles in the same year.

References

1975
All-Ireland Under-21 Football Championship